The lake Tourilli is a freshwater body at the head of the Tourilli River, flowing in the Laurentides Wildlife Reserve. This lake is located entirely in the unorganized territory of Lac-Croche, in the La Jacques-Cartier Regional County Municipality, administrative region of the Capitale-Nationale, in province of Quebec, in Canada.

The Lac Tourilli watershed is served by a few secondary forest roads for the purposes of forestry and recreational tourism activities.

Forestry is the main economic activity in the sector; recreational tourism, second.

The surface of Lac Tourilli is generally frozen from the beginning of December to the end of March; safe circulation on the ice is generally done from the end of December to the beginning of March.

Geography 
This lake deep between the mountains is like a large misshapen X. It has four large bays:
 the third on  towards the north;
 the fourth in the form of growth comprising seven islands stretches over  towards the mouth of the lake.

From the mouth of Lac Tourilli, the current descends on  first to the north, then generally to the south, following the course of the Tourilli river until its confluence with the Sainte-Anne River; thence, the current generally flows south by borrowing the current from the Sainte-Anne river to the northeast bank of the Saint-Laurent river.

Toponymy 
The toponym "Lac Tourilli" is directly linked to the river of the same name.

The toponym "Lac Tourilli" was formalized on December 5, 1968, by the Commission de toponymie du Québec.

Notes and references

See also 
 Laurentides Wildlife Reserve
 Lac-Croche, an unorganized territory
 Gregory Lake
 Tourilli River
 Rivière Sainte-Anne
 List of lakes of Canada

Lakes of Capitale-Nationale
La Jacques-Cartier Regional County Municipality
Laurentides Wildlife Reserve